Piotr Dumała (born 9 July 1956 in Warsaw) is a Polish film director and animator.
He is noted for his animation technique. While training to be a sculptor, he discovered that scratching images into painted plaster could be a beautiful way to create animations. This is only one technique of a method called destructive animation, where one image is erased (in this case, painted over) and re-drawn to create the next frame in the sequence. William Kentridge is another artist who works in this destructive way. Dumała's main themes, and the way to show them, recall ostensibly the world of writer Franz Kafka. His film Crime and Punishment was included in the Animation Show of Shows. In 1992 his film Franz Kafka won the Grand Prix for best short film at the World Festival of Animated Film - Animafest Zagreb, and his film Hipopotamy received Grand Prize for Independent Short Animation at 2014 Ottawa International Animation Festival.

Filmography
 1981 Lykantropia
 1983 Czarny kapturek
 1984 Latające Włosy
 1985 A Gentle Spirit (Łagodna)
 1987 Academy Leader Variations (segment)
 1987 Nerwowe życie kosmosu
 1988 Walls (Ściany)
 1989 Wolność nogi
 1992 Franz Kafka
 2000 Crime and Punishment (Zbrodnia i kara)
 2009 The Forest (Las)
 2014 Hipopotamy

References

External links

Piotr Dumała at culture.pl
 Interview with Piotr Dumała at Animation World Network
 Piotr Dumała at filmpolski.pl

1956 births
Living people
Film people from Warsaw
Polish film directors
Polish animated film directors
Polish animators
Łódź Film School alumni